The School of Social Work, Odense is a Danish University College under the aegis of the University College Little Belt located at Tolderlundsvej number 5 in the city of Odense. The college is in the Skibhus neighborhood (Danish: Skibhus kvarteret) near the Bazar Fyn and the old taxation house. This University College offers both Bachelor's degrees as well as Diplomas.

The building at Tolderlundsvej 

The current building at Tolderlundsvej was a part of the Thomas B. Thriges factories until 1996. After the building was sold by the Thrige fund to The School of Social Work, it went through a series of renovations. The institution merged into the University College, Little Belt with a varied number of courses.

The building houses 4 floors of modern classrooms, computer rooms, study rooms and offices for the staff and student organizations. The building also contains two large lecture halls. The school has its own library with literature and journals in disciplines such as law, social work, social sciences, psychology, psychiatry, human resources, economist, welfare, employment measures, educational and vocational guidance and tax systems. The school has its own cafeteria and pub.

The decoration of the building was by Danish artist Thomas Bang with support from the Danish State Arts Foundation. The building is open 24 hours. Access requires a valid student card or key card after normal school hours.

Courses

Bachelor's Degrees 

 Social Work – Bachelor of Social Work

Diploma Degree Courses 

 The Social Diploma
 Diploma, Child and Youth
 Social Diploma in Family Therapy
 Diploma in Criminology
 The Social Diploma on elderly and demented

Sources

References 

Colleges in Denmark